The Africa Zone was the unique zone within Group 4 of the regional Davis Cup competition in 2022. The zone's competition was held in round robin format in Kigali, Rwanda, from 5 to 9 July 2022 and in Yaoundé, Cameroon, from 27 to 30 July 2022.

Participating nations

Inactive nations

Draw
Date: 4–9 July 2022 and 27–30 July 2022

Location: Ecology Tennis Club, Kigali, Rwanda (clay) and MUNDI Sport Complex, Yaoundé, Cameroon (hard)

Format: Round-robin basis. In Kigali, one pool of four teams and one pool of five teams. The winners of each pool will play-off against each other to determine the nation promoted to Africa Group III in 2023. In Yaoundé, two pools of four teams. The winners of each pool will play-off against each other to determine the other nation promoted to Africa Group III in 2023.

Seeding

Kigali

 1Davis Cup Rankings as of 8 March 2022

Yaoundé

 1Davis Cup Rankings as of 8 March 2022

Round Robin

Pool A (Kigali)

Pool B (Kigali)

Pool A (Yaoundé)

Pool B (Yaoundé)
 
Standings are determined by: 1. number of wins; 2. number of matches; 3. in two-team ties, head-to-head records; 4. in three-team ties, (a) percentage of sets won (head-to-head records if two teams remain tied), then (b) percentage of games won (head-to-head records if two teams remain tied), then (c) Davis Cup rankings.

Playoffs 

Round Robin

Pool A (Kigali)

Rwanda vs. Uganda

Sudan vs. Tanzania

Rwanda vs. Tanzania

Uganda vs. Sudan

Rwanda vs. Sudan

Uganda vs. Tanzania

Pool B (Kigali)

Botswana vs. DR Congo

Angola vs. Togo

Angola vs. DR Congo

Congo vs. Togo

Botswana vs. Angola

Congo vs. DR Congo

Botswana vs. Togo

Angola vs. Congo

Botswana vs. Congo

Togo vs. DR Congo

Pool A (Yaoundé)

Nigeria vs. Mauritius

Gabon vs. Burundi

Nigeria vs. Burundi

Gabon vs. Mauritius

Nigeria vs. Gabon

Burundi vs. Mauritius

Pool B (Yaoundé)

Cameroon vs. Senegal

Ghana vs. Ethiopia

Cameroon vs. Ethiopia

Ghana vs. Senegal

Cameroon vs. Ghana

Ethiopia vs. Senegal

Play-offs

Promotion play-off

Rwanda vs. Togo

Burundi vs. Senegal

3rd place play-off

Sudan vs. DR Congo

Nigeria vs. Ghana

5th place play-off

Tanzania vs. Botswana

Gabon vs. Cameroon

7th place play-off

Angola vs. Uganda

Mauritius vs. Ethiopia

References

External links
Official Website

Davis Cup Europe/Africa Zone
Africa Zone